Shuter may refer to
Shuter (surname)
Shuter House in South Africa
Shuter & Shooter Publishers based in South Africa